Tziaos ( or ;  or ) is a Turkish Cypriot village in Cyprus, located 3 km north of Marathovounos. De facto, it is under the control of Northern Cyprus.

References 

Communities in Famagusta District
Populated places in Gazimağusa District
Municipalities of Northern Cyprus